Halimocnemis is a genus of flowering plants belonging to the family Amaranthaceae.

Its native range is Eastern Mediterranean to Xinjiang and Afghanistan.

Species:

Halimocnemis azarbaijanensis 
Halimocnemis beresinii 
Halimocnemis glaberrima 
Halimocnemis karelinii 
Halimocnemis lasiantha 
Halimocnemis latifolia 
Halimocnemis longifolia 
Halimocnemis macrantha 
Halimocnemis mironovii 
Halimocnemis mollissima 
Halimocnemis occulta 
Halimocnemis pedunculata 
Halimocnemis pilifera 
Halimocnemis sclerosperma 
Halimocnemis smirnowii 
Halimocnemis villosa

References

Amaranthaceae
Amaranthaceae genera